Attalea funifera, the Bahia piassava, is a species of palm (family Arecaceae), native to eastern Brazil. It is a major source of piassava fiber, used in brooms and brushes.

References

funifera
Fiber plants
Endemic flora of Brazil
Flora of Northeast Brazil
Flora of Southeast Brazil
Plants described in 1826